Andrew Joseph Livingston Conners  (born November 12, 1978) is a butterfly stroke swimmer from the United States, who competed for Puerto Rico at the 2000 Summer Olympics and at the 2004 Summer Olympics.

His mother is from Puerto Rico. He competed for United States at the 1997 World University Games, but has represented Puerto Rico in swimming since then.

Livingston attended the University of Nevada Las Vegas. He was also named the 2001 UNLV Sportsman of the Year.

Life After Swimming 
In 2008 Andrew joined the US Coast Guard.  After finishing boot camp, he was stationed in Winchester Bay Oregon. He then applied for Information Systems Technician "A" School located in Petaluma, California. After IT "A" School he is now stationed at CAMSPAC Point Reyes, CA.

He attended Cypress Falls High School in Houson, TX.

External links
1 http://www.fleetswimming.com/
2 UNLV Swimming Profile

1978 births
Living people
People from Farmington, Michigan
American male swimmers
Puerto Rican male swimmers
Male butterfly swimmers
Olympic swimmers of Puerto Rico
Swimmers at the 1999 Pan American Games
Swimmers at the 2000 Summer Olympics
Swimmers at the 2003 Pan American Games
Swimmers at the 2004 Summer Olympics
Pan American Games competitors for Puerto Rico
UNLV Rebels men's swimmers
Goodwill Games medalists in swimming
Central American and Caribbean Games gold medalists for Puerto Rico
Competitors at the 1998 Central American and Caribbean Games
Central American and Caribbean Games medalists in swimming
Competitors at the 2001 Goodwill Games